Fred Sirieix (born 27 January 1972) is a French maître d'hôtel best known for appearing on Channel 4's First Dates, and BBC Two's Million Pound Menu. Sirieix grew up in Limoges, France and trained to work in front of house in a Michelin-starred restaurant in France before working at La Tante Claire in London. Until 2019 he was the general manager of Michelin-starred restaurant Galvin at Windows at the London Hilton. 

Sirieix is the founder of National Waiters Day, the training tool the Art of Service, and the Galvin Cup and Galvin's Chance charities. He helped to launch the Right Course, which teaches prisoners about the service industry, and has also released a book called First Dates: The Art of Love and a music track, "La Vie Continue". He has been featured in an ITV show, with Gordon Ramsay and Gino D'Acampo, entitled Gordon, Gino and Fred: Road Trip (2019), and Remarkable Places to Eat on BBC Two (2019).

Early life
Sirieix was brought up in Limoges, France. His parents both worked in healthcare and he says they inspired him to work in the service industry: "The conversation around the dinner table was all about patient care. It was about making sure people had a good experience.”

Career
Sirieix began his career in the Edmonton Green branch of McDonald’s. Following this, he worked at Le Gavroche, Sartoria and Brasserie Roux. He was the general manager at the restaurant Galvin at Windows for 14 years (left in December 2019), a Michelin-starred restaurant on the 28th floor of the London Hilton hotel on Park Lane.

On Christmas Day 2012, Sirieix launched National Waiters Day to celebrate the work of front of house staff and attract people into the profession. In 2011, he launched The Art of Service - a board game for teaching customer service in hotels and restaurants. Sirieix is also involved in charity work, creating a cocktail competition called the Galvin Cup, which awards young bartenders. He also created the charity Galvin's Chance, which supports underprivileged young front of house staff in London and Scotland's best hotels, restaurants and bars. In 2017, Sirieix, along with Novus, launched the Right Course, which remodels prison staff restaurants to operate as high street restaurants to teach prisoners cooking and about other aspects of service industry.

Television
Sirieix is the Maître d''' on Channel 4's First Dates, deciding to be part of the show because "it sounded fun and you have to consider any opportunity. I looked carefully at it and became sure it was a good programme at heart." He was also Maître d'  on the First Dates spin-off show, First Dates Abroad. In addition to First Dates, Sirieix, along with celebrity chef Michel Roux Jr, co-hosted BBC Two's Michel Roux's Service. In 2012, he appeared on BBC One's The Apprentice whilst the programme filmed at Galvin at Windows. In 2017, he appeared in Channel 4's Tried and Tasted: The Ultimate Shopping List.

In 2018, he presented Million Pound Menu, a new show for BBC Two. In December 2017, he appeared in ITV's Gordon, Gino and Fred's Great Christmas Roast, alongside Gordon Ramsay and Gino D'Acampo.

In 2019, he hosted the CBBC series Step Up to the Plate with Allegra McEvedy where they tested 8 young people in each episode to see if they had the skills to run their own restaurant. A second series was broadcast in 2021.

In 2019, he presented a series on BBC Two entitled Remarkable Places to Eat, in which he was taken by chefs to their favourite restaurants in different cities.

In 2019, he co-presented the Channel 4 series Snackmasters with comedian Jayde Adams, in which two haute cuisine chefs are challenged with recreating a well-known brand of snack or fast food product, such as KFC's Zinger burger or Monster Munch crisps, from scratch. Two further series were broadcast in 2020 and 2021.

In June 2022, he and his fiancée appeared in Channel 4 series Celebrity Gogglebox.

Other ventures
In 2016, Sirieix released a book called First Dates: The Art of Love.

In 2015, Sirieix released a music track with Mark King from the band Level 42 and rapper XO MAN called "" ("Life Goes On"). Sirieix describes it as "a song about love, loss and everything in between".

In 2021 it was announced he would be dancing with Dianne Buswell in the 2021 Strictly Come Dancing Christmas Special.

Awards
In 2010, Sirieix was nominated for the Cateys manager of the year award, winning it three years later in 2013. In October 2011, he won the National Restaurant Awards' Personality of the Year for his charity work and promoting the hospitality profession. He was voted Educator of the Year in 2012 at the Imbibe awards and in March 2014, he was awarded an honorary degree from the University of West London.

Personal life

Sirieix lives with his Jamaican fiancée identified publicly only as "Fruitcake".  His two children from a previous relationship live in Peckham. His daughter is professional British diver Andrea Spendolini-Sirieix. He was in the crowd to witness her win gold in the Women’s 10m Platform at the 2022 Commonwealth Games in Birmingham.

References

External links

Fred Sirieix at Biogs.com
Fred Sirieix at The Seven Sins of...''

1972 births
Living people
People from Limoges
French expatriates in England
Channel 4 people
French television personalities